Leon Sopić (born 29 October 2000) is a Croatian professional footballer who plays as a defender for Trnje on loan from Dinamo Zagreb II.

Club career
Sopić made his professional debut with Rudeš in a 1–1 Croatian First Football League tie with NK Istra 1961 on 18 May 2018. On 5 July 2019, Sopić transferred to Emmen in the Netherlands. As of 1 October 2020, Leon Sopić is officially signed by the second team of GNK Dinamo Zagreb.

Personal life
Sopić is the son of the Croatian former footballer Željko Sopić.

References

External links
 
 

2000 births
Living people
People from Ahlen
Sportspeople from Münster (region)
German people of Croatian descent
German footballers
Association football defenders
Eredivisie players
Croatian Football League players
FC Emmen players
NK Rudeš players
GNK Dinamo Zagreb II players
German expatriate footballers
German expatriate sportspeople in the Netherlands
Expatriate footballers in the Netherlands
Footballers from North Rhine-Westphalia